XHGML-FM is a radio station on 92.1 FM in Guamúchil, Sinaloa, Mexico. It is owned by Grupo Chávez Radio and carries its La Maxi grupera format.

History
XHGML-FM received its concession on October 15, 1990. It was owned by Rutilio Blancarte Díaz and sold to Grupo Chávez in 2006.

In 2021, Grupo Chávez Radio leased XHREV-FM in Los Mochis and XHGML to Roque Mascareño Chávez—grandson of the founder of Chávez Radio—for his Vibra Radio venture, which had also purchased XHVQ-FM in Culiacán and XHMAT-FM in Mazatlán.

On September 24, 2022, after Vibra Radio won a new station (XHCCCI-FM 95.1) in the IFT-8 radio station auction, XHGML changed to the La Maxi format, based on XHMAX-FM 102.5 in Los Mochis.

References

Radio stations in Sinaloa